Carlux is a commune in the Dordogne department in Nouvelle-Aquitaine in southwestern France.

Population

The village of Carlux has a centrally located 'bourg' (fortification ruin) that dates back to the 12th century, which is currently (June 2013) in the process of repair/restoration, and many other clearly historically and/or architecturally interesting buildings.

As of June 2013, it has a bakery (boulangerie), a butcher/caterer (boucher/traiteur) and a grocery store (épicerie), plus three restaurants (one first class, one very nice if simple and another which claims to be a peasant 'halle').  All seem to be well frequented.

Also located in just outside the village is the Domaine des Bequignolles, a quality chocolate factory with a direct sale (vente directe) counter.

Tha annual village festival (fête) is normally the weekend of the first week in June.

See also
Communes of the Dordogne department

References

Communes of Dordogne